A wooden statue of Melania Trump, sculpted by Aleš "Maxi" Župevc, was installed in her hometown of Sevnica, Slovenia in 2019. The wood carving was commissioned by Brad Downey, an American artist living in Berlin.

The statue was torched on the night of July 4, 2020, and removed soon after. It was replaced by a bronze-cast version in September that year.

Description

The statue is a life-size depiction of Melania Trump. In its original wooden form, the dress and arms of the statue are painted powder blue, to reflect her outfit at the inauguration of Donald Trump.

The original statue was carved out of a poplar tree, and the bronze replacement stands on the same trunk.

History

Wooden version
Brad Downey commissioned Aleš Župevc, also known as "Maxi," to create the statue as part of an exposition in Ljubljana. Župevc, an amateur woodworker employed as a pipelayer, carved the statue out of a poplar tree using a chainsaw. The statue was officially unveiled on July 5, 2019.

Following the statue's unveiling, it was met with derision; an ITV report quoted local residents calling it "a disgrace" and comparing it to Smurfette. In an interview with The New York Times, Downey said that "[Župevc] wasn't making a joke."

The statue was set on fire on the night of July 4, 2020, coinciding with American Independence Day celebrations. It was removed by Downey soon after. The burnt statue was exhibited in a seaside town near Sevnica.

Bronze version
A replacement, cast in bronze, was unveiled on September 15, 2020.

See also
 Cultural depictions of Melania Trump
 Statue of Donald Trump

References

2019 establishments in Slovenia
2019 sculptures
2020 sculptures
Bronze sculptures
Destroyed sculptures
Monuments and memorials in Slovenia
Outdoor sculptures
Sculptures of women
Statues in Slovenia
Vandalized works of art
Wooden sculptures